Trephina  Gorge is a gorge  in the Northern Territory of Australia located in the locality of Hart in the East MacDonnell Ranges  about   east of Alice Springs.

The gorge is named after the Trephina Creek which is believed to be named after Tryphina Benstead (née Rains) who was the wife of William (Bill) Benstead, the manager of Undoolya Station from 1877 onwards and the first licensee of the Stuart Arms Hotel in Alice Springs.

Prior to August 1965, all of the gorge was located within The Garden pastoral lease.  On 12 August 1965, land associated with part of the gorge was excised from the pastoral lease and gazetted as the "Trephina Gorge Scenic Reserve".  This land was renamed in 1978 as the "Trephina Gorge Nature Park".  On 17 September 2008, the title of this land was transferred to the Atnerrperrke Aboriginal Land Trust to be held on trust for its traditional owners.  The land was subsequently leased to the Northern Territory government for 99 years to continue its use as the Trephina Gorge Nature Park.

See also
The Skinny Dip

References 

Canyons and gorges in the Northern Territory
Nature parks of the Northern Territory